Adolf Meyer (September 13, 1866 – March 17, 1950) was a Swiss-born psychiatrist who rose to prominence as the first psychiatrist-in-chief of the Johns Hopkins Hospital (1910-1941). He was president of the American Psychiatric Association in 1927–28 and was one of the most influential figures in psychiatry in the first half of the twentieth century. His focus on collecting detailed case histories on patients was one of the most prominent of his contributions.  He oversaw the building and development of the Henry Phipps Psychiatric Clinic at Johns Hopkins Hospital, opened in April 1913, making sure it was suitable for scientific research, training and treatment. Meyer's work at the Phipps Clinic is possibly the most significant aspect of his career.

Meyer's main theoretical contribution was his idea of ergasiology (a term he derived from the Greek for "working" and "doing") to describe a psychobiology.  This brought together all the biological, social and psychological factors and symptoms pertaining to a patient.  It considered mental illnesses to be a product of dysfunctional personality not a pathology of the brain. Believing that whole-life social and biological factors should be central to both diagnosis and treatment Meyer was one of the earliest psychologists to support occupational therapy as an important connection between the activities of an individual and their mental health, and incorporated community based activities and services to develop people's everyday living skills.

Personal life and education 
Adolf Meyer was born in Niederweningen, Switzerland, in 1866. He was the son of a Zwinglian pastor. Meyer received his MD from the University of Zurich in 1892, where he studied neurology under Auguste Forel. During his time at the university, he studied abroad in Paris, London and Edinburgh, working under John Hughlings Jackson and Jean-Martin Charcot. His doctorate thesis was published in 1892 and had to do with the reptilian forebrain. Unable to secure an appointment with the university, he emigrated to the United States in 1892. Meyer married Mary Potter Brooks, of Newburgh, New York, on September 15, 1902. They had one daughter, Julia Lathrup Meyer, on February 14, 1916. Meyer died on March 17, 1950, at his home at 4305 Rugby Road in Baltimore, Maryland, of a heart attack. He was buried in Druid Ridge Cemetery in Pikesville, Maryland.

Medical career

Early career 
After moving to the United States, Meyer first practiced neurology and teaching at the University of Chicago, where he was exposed to the ideas of the Chicago functionalists. He was unable to find a paid full-time post at the University of Chicago, so his time at the university was short-lived; serving from 1892 to 1895. From 1893 to 1895, he served as pathologist at the new mental hospital at Kankakee, Illinois, after which he worked at the state hospital at Worcester, Massachusetts from 1895 to 1902, all the while publishing papers prolifically in neurology, neuropathology, and psychiatry. He also served as docent at Clark University.

Time in New York 
In 1902, he became director of the Pathological Institute of the New York State Hospital system (shortly afterwards given its present name, The Psychiatric Institute), where in the next few years he shaped much of American psychiatry by emphasizing the importance of keeping detailed patient records and by introducing both Emil Kraepelin's classificatory system and Sigmund Freud's ideas. While in the New York State Hospital system, Meyer was one of the first importers of Freud's ideas about the importance both of sexuality and of the formative influence of early rearing on the adult personality. Meyer found many of Freud's ideas and therapeutic methods insightful and useful, but he rejected psychoanalysis as a wholesale etiological explanation of mental disorders in favor of his own theory of psychobiology. He never practiced psychoanalysis and always kept it at arm's length from Johns Hopkins because of Freud's increasingly dogmatic insistence on the psychical causation of mental illnesses. As he wrote in his presidential address to the 84th Annual Meeting of the American Psychiatric Association: "Those who imagine that all psychiatry and psychopathology and therapy have to resolve themselves into a smattering of claims and hypotheses of psychoanalysis and that they stand or fall with one's feelings about psychoanalysis, are equally misguided". Meyer was Professor of Psychiatry at Cornell University from 1904 to 1909.

The Phipps Clinic at Johns Hopkins 

In 1908, Meyer was asked to become the director of a new psychiatric clinic at the Johns Hopkins Hospital after Henry Phipps Jr. donated 1.5 million dollars to open the clinic. Meyer accepted the offer, which he described as "the most important professorship [in psychiatry] in the English-speaking domain." He oversaw the building and development of the clinic and made sure the building was suitable for scientific research, training and treatment. The Henry Phipps Psychiatric Clinic opened in April 1913.

Meyer's work at the Phipps Clinic is arguably the most significant aspect of his career. His model for the Phipps Clinic combined clinical and laboratory work, which was the first time these elements were combined in a mental institute in the United States. Though the Phipps Clinic did not use the clinical model of Emil Kraepelin, Meyer did incorporate some of Kraepelin's practices into the clinic. These practices include extensive observations of the patients and studying both the presymptomatic and remissive phases of mental illness, along with periods of acute illness.

Meyer also served as a Professor of Psychiatry at Johns Hopkins School of Medicine from 1910 to 1941. In his beginning years at Johns Hopkins, Meyer helped oversee the work of a few of his aspiring students. Phyllis Greenacre, from the University of Chicago, and Curt Richter, a Harvard graduate, both had the opportunity to study under Meyer. Most notably, Richter studied the behavior of rats with Meyer and John Watson, a behavioral psychologist. Adolf Meyer worked at Johns Hopkins until his retirement in 1941. Meyer also conducted a nine-month study of the brain of Giuseppe Zangara, assassin who shot at President Franklin Roosevelt and killed Mayor Anton Cermak.

Legacy

Honors and awards
Meyer received honorary degrees from Glasgow University in 1901, Clark University in 1909, Yale University in 1934 and Harvard University in 1942. In 1942, Meyer was awarded the Thomas Salmon Medal for distinguished service in psychiatry.

In 1938, the neuropsychiatric clinic at Rhode Island State Hospital for Mental Diseases was named after Meyer.

People 
Many of Meyer's students went on to make significant contributions to American psychiatry or psychoanalysis, though not necessarily as Meyerians. Most of the founders of the New York Psychoanalytic Society had worked under Meyer at Manhattan State Hospital, including its chief architect Abraham Arden Brill, and Charles Macfie Campbell.

Meyer and William Henry Welch played an instrumental role in Clifford Beers' founding of the Connecticut Society for Mental Hygiene in 1908. Under Meyer's direction, Leo Kanner founded the first child psychiatry clinic in the United States at the Johns Hopkins Hospital in 1930.

Contributions to psychology 

Meyer's main contribution was in his ideas of psychobiology, where he focused on addressing all biological, social and psychological factors and symptoms pertaining to a patient. Meyer coined the term "ergasiology", which has Greek roots for "working" and "doing", as another way to classify psychobiology. One of his ideas was that mental illnesses were a product of a dysfunctional personality and not from the pathology of the brain. He also stressed the idea that social and biological factors that affect someone throughout their entire life should be heavily considered when diagnosing and treating a patient. Another contribution of Meyer was that he was one of the earlier psychologists that supported occupational therapy. He thought there was an important connection between the activities of an individual and their mental health. Taking this into consideration he looked for community based activities and services to aid people with everyday living skills.

Meyer was a strong believer in the importance of empiricism, and advocated repeatedly for a scientific, and, particularly, a biological approach to understanding mental illness. He hoped that the Phipps Clinic would help put mental illness on the same ground as every other human illness. He insisted that patients could best be understood through consideration of their "psychobiological" life situations. He reframed mental disease as biopsychosocial "reaction types" rather than as biologically specifiable natural disease entities. In 1906, he reframed dementia praecox as a "reaction type", a discordant bundle of maladaptive habits that arose as a response to biopsychosocial stressors.

Meyer was also involved with the Eugenics Records Office, which he viewed as a natural extension of the mental hygiene movement which he helped to create. He served on the advisory council of the American Eugenics Society for 12 years, from 1923 to 1935. Meyer's views on eugenics have not yet been studied closely and his association with the Eugenics Record Office cannot be equated straightforwardly with the extremism of some eugenicists, especially in light of the fact that the fundamental premise of Meyerian psychobiology contradicted the genetic determinism that underpinned scientific racism in the first half of the twentieth century.

Publications 
Meyer never published a textbook. Between 1890 and 1943, he published roughly 400 articles in scientific and academic journals, mostly in English, but also in his native German and in French. Most were published together after his death in 1950 in four bound volumes called The Collected Papers of Adolf Meyer.
 The Collected Papers of Adolf Meyer (Baltimore: Johns Hopkins University Press, 1951)
 The Anatomical Facts and Clinical Varieties of Traumatic Insanity (1904)
 The Nature and Conception of Dementia Praecox (1910)
 Constructive Formulation of Schizophrenia (1922)

References

Notes 
Guide to The Adolf Meyer Collection at http://www.medicalarchives.jhmi.edu; a Guide to the personal papers collection of Adolf Meyer at The Alan Mason Chesney Medical Archives of the Johns Hopkins Medical Institutions with a short biography and timeline

Further reading 
The Collected Papers of Adolf Meyer, edited by Eunice E. Winters. Baltimore: The Johns Hopkins University Press, 1950–1952. 4 vols.

The Commonsense Psychiatry of Dr. Adolf Meyer: Fifty-two Selected Papers, edited by Alfred A. Lief. New York: McGraw-Hill, 1948.

Psychobiology: a Science of Man, compiled and edited by Eunice E. Winters and Anna Mae Bowers. Springfield, IL: Charles C Thomas, (1957). This posthumous book was based on the first Thomas W. Salmon Lectures, which Meyer gave in 1931.

George Kirby's Guides for History Taking and Clinical Examination of Psychiatric Cases (Utica: State Hospitals Press 1921) is essentially the form Meyer created and used at Manhattan State Hospital in 1905–1906. It provides an excellent view of Meyer's early approach to taking case histories.

Richard Noll, American Madness: The Rise and Fall of Dementia Praecox (Cambridge, MA: Harvard University Press, 2011).

S. D. Lamb, Pathologist of the Mind: Adolf Meyer and the Origins of American Psychiatry (Baltimore: Johns Hopkins University Press, 2014) Reissued in paperback in 2018.

Susan Lamb, "'My Resisting Getting Well': Neurasthenia and Subconscious Conflict in Patient-Psychiatrist Interactions in Prewar America,"  Journal of the History of the Behavioral Sciences 52/2 (2016): pages 124-45.

Susan Lamb, "Social Skills: Adolf Meyer’s Revision of Clinical Skill for the New Psychiatry of the Twentieth Century. Medical History Vol. 59 No. 3 (2015): pages 443-64.

Susan Lamb, "Social, Motivational, and Symptomatic Diversity: An Analysis of the Patient Population of the Phipps Psychiatric Clinic at Johns Hopkins Hospital, 1913 – 1917," Canadian Bulletin of Medical History Vol. 29 No.2: pages 243-63.

Adolf Meyer, "What Do Histories of Cases of Insanity Teach Us Concerning Preventive Mental Hygiene during the Years of School Life?", Psychological Clinic 2, no. 4 (1908): 89–101. PMC 5138873 

Meyer's influence on American psychology can be explored in Defining American Psychology: The Correspondence Between Adolf Meyer and Edward Bradford Titchener, edited by Ruth Leys and Rand B. Evans. Baltimore/London: The Johns Hopkins University Press, (1990).

Meyer's importance to the introduction and development of American psychoanalysis is discussed and interpreted in: John C. Burnham, Psychoanalysis and American Medicine, 1894–1917: Medicine, Science, and Culture (New York: International Universities Press, 1967); John Gach, "Culture & Complex: On the Early History of Psychoanalysis in America" (pages 135–160) in Essays in the History of Psychiatry, edited by Edwin R. Wallace IV and Lucius Pressley (Columbia, SC: William S. Hall Psychiatric Institute, 1980); Nathan Hale, Freud and the Americans: The Beginnings of Psychoanalysis in the United States (Oxford: Oxford University Press, 1995); and Chapter Six of S. D. Lamb, Pathologist of the Mind: Adolf Meyer and the Origins of American Psychiatry (Baltimore: Johns Hopkins University Press, 2014); Ruth Leys, "Meyer's Dealings With Jones: A Chapter in the History of the American Response to Psychoanalysis," Journal of the History of the Behavioral Sciences 17 (1981): pages 445-465; Ruth Leys, "Meyer, Jung, and the Limits of Association," Bulletin of the History of Medicine 59 (1985): pages 345-360; Scull, Andrew, and Jay Schulkin, "Psychobiology, Psychiatry, and Psychoanalysis: The Intersecting Careers of Adolf Meyer, Phyllis Greenacre, and Curt Richter." Medical History (National Institute of Health, Jan. 2009). Web. 22 Feb. 2015.

See also Theodore Lidz, "Adolf Meyer and the Development of American Psychiatry." The American Journal of Psychiatry, 123(3), pp 320–332 (1966) and C.H. Christiansen "Adolf Meyer Revisited:Connections between Lifestyle, Resilience and Illness". Journal of Occupational Science 14(2),63‐76. (2007).

External links

1866 births
1950 deaths
American science writers
American psychiatrists
Johns Hopkins Hospital physicians
People associated with the University of Zurich
Swiss emigrants to the United States
American people of Swiss-German descent
Cornell University faculty
History of psychiatry
Presidents of the American Psychiatric Association
Niederweningen
People from Dielsdorf District
New York State Psychiatric Institute people